Gloria Agyemang is an academic, who is the Professor of Accounting and Head of the School of Business and Management at Royal Holloway, University of London. Agyemang's research interests include accounting in less-developed and emerging economies and the management of educational institutions, non-governmental organisations and public sector organisations. Agyemang was an undergraduate student at the University of Ghana and a postgraduate at McGill University, and worked for accountancy firms in Ghana and the UK. In 2006, Agyemang was awarded her PhD by Royal Holloway and was appointed as a lecturer there. She previously worked in teaching and management roles in several other universities in the UK, Ghana and Zimbabwe, including at University College Worcester and Thames Valley University. In 2020, Agyemang was featured in Phenomenal Women, a photographic exhibition about black female professors in the UK.

References

Academics of Royal Holloway, University of London
McGill University alumni
University of Ghana alumni
Women accountants
Year of birth missing (living people)
Living people